Choi Su-rin (born 25 December 1974) is a South Korean actress and model. She is known for her roles in dramas such as Hi! School: Love On, Who Are You: School 2015, Bad Thief, Good Thief and Enemies from the Past. She also had lead roles in Dangerous Love and My Bloody Lover.

Filmography

Television

Film

Awards and nominations
 2015 Nominated for best supporting actress

References

External links 
 
 
 
 Profile (naver)
 Profile (daum)

1974 births
Living people
21st-century South Korean actresses
South Korean female models
South Korean television actresses
South Korean film actresses